Tomislavci is a village located in the Bačka Topola municipality, in the North Bačka District of Serbia. It is situated in the Autonomous Province of Vojvodina. The village has a Serb ethnic majority and its population numbering 696 people (2002 census).

Name
In Serbian the village is known as Tomislavci / Томиславци (formerly also Orešković / Орешковић), in Hungarian as Andrásmező, and in Croatian as Tomislavci.

Historical population

See also
List of places in Serbia
List of cities, towns and villages in Vojvodina

References
Slobodan Ćurčić, Broj stanovnika Vojvodine, Novi Sad, 1996.

External links
Tomislavci video

Places in Bačka